The Big Hit Music discography consists of most of the records distributed under the label since 2005.

2000s

2005-2008

2009

2010s

2010

2011

2012

2013

2014

2015

2016

2017

2018

2019

2020s

2020

2021

2022

References

External links 

K-pop discographies
Discographies of South Korean record labels